Handball in the United States is a minor sport. The U.S. is represented in international competitions, such as the Summer Olympics and the Pan American Games, by the United States men's national handball team and the United States women's national handball team. The U.S. men's and women's teams have struggled in international competitions against nations where handball is more popular.

It is governed by USA Team Handball, which is funded in part by the U.S. Olympic Committee.
Previously, the governing body was the United States Team Handball Federation, but was revoked of its governing duties by the United States Olympic Committee.

Handball is starting to be recognized by a few notable universities, such as University of Virginia, UNC, UCLA, UC Berkeley, United States Naval Academy, United States Military Academy, United States Air Force Academy, Texas A&M University and others. Those schools and academies along with other amateur teams participate in the Club National Championships and Collegiate National Championships, one for men and the other for women.  There are also several club level leagues in various sections of the country, like the Midwest Team Handball League, Northeast Team Handball League, and the Great Lakes Team Handball Association.

History

John Jakobs was the founder of the first handball section (First German Sport Club of Brooklyn) in the USA. On 26 May 1926 he made a call in the New Yorker Herold to promote handball.

On 28 October 1926 the first field handball game was played between the Turnverein Union City and the First German Sport Club of Brooklyn. The game ended in a 9 to 9 draw. Newark TV joined the other two and they played some friendly games.

In 1927 the German American Athletic Union (GAAU) started to sponsor field handball. The first handball chairman was Gustav Ricke from First German Sport Club of Brooklyn. In the season 1927-28 only friendly games were played.

Because handball was part of the 1936 Summer Olympics the Amateur Athletic Union (AAU) started to sponsor field handball in 1934. Many of the handball leaders of the DAAV were chosen to lead the handball committee of the AAU.

In 1942 the Office of Alien Property Custodian seized all records of the German American Athletic Union.

After the World War II handball had no national body until 1959 as the United States Team Handball Federation was founded. In the same year the United States Handball Federation League was found. The Elizabeth S.C. won at least all season until 1967. In 1962 nine teams from New York and New Jersey played in that league as a winter conditioner for soccer. In 1963 already 20 teams with 200 players played handball.

Middle school

San Francisco Bay Area
The Youth Team Handball Middle School League and Youth California Cup organized by San Francisco CalHeat THC are the only competitions accommodating middle school in the USA.

Current members of the Youth Team Handball Middle School League:
Bret Harte Middle School (Boys & Girls)
Castillero Middle School (Boys & Girls)
Stanbridge Academy
Sterne School
John Muir Middle School

Past members of the Youth Team Handball Middle School League:
 Lycée Français de San Francisco
San Francisco CalHeat THC

High school

San Francisco Bay Area
The Youth Team Handball High School League and Youth California Cup organized by San Francisco CalHeat THC are the high school competitions in the SF Bay Area.

1 Youth Cup was cancelled due to bad air quality because of the Camp Fire (2018). Lycée Français got the title because of their regular season record.

Current members of the Youth Team Handball High School League:
Cali Kings Handball
Pioneer High School
SF CalHeat
Sterne School

Past members of the Youth Team Handball High School League:
Bayhill High School
Leland High School
 Compass High School
 Lycée Français de San Francisco

Montgomery County, Maryland
The MCPS Athletics offers team handball as corollary sports.

Current members of the MCPS handball:
Clarksburg High School
Sherwood High School
Thomas Sprigg Wootton High School
Montgomery Blair High School
Walt Whitman High School

Former members of the MCPS handball:
Watkins Mill High School
Colonel Zadok A. Magruder High School
Northwest High School
Seneca Valley High School
Bethesda-Chevy Chase High School
Walter Johnson High School

Professional leagues 
In 1978, the National Teamball League was formed with six clubs: the Detroit Hawks, Chicago Chiefs, Boston Comets, New York Stags, Philadelphia Warriors and Pittsburgh Points. The NTL (described as an "Americanized" version of team handball, with faster play and higher scores) was bankrolled by Aben Johnson, Jr., owner of WXON-TV in Detroit, and WXON aired the league's first game, a 48-26 victory by Detroit over Chicago. The match, played in front of about 800 people at Macomb County Community College in Warren, Michigan, was taped in early December and aired on WXON on Friday, December 8, 1978, and again the next day.

The Hawks-Chiefs matchup was the only NTL match known to have been televised; in fact, it was one of the few known to have been played, as press coverage of the loop was almost nonexistent. A local Boston-area newspaper, the Charlestown Patriot and Somerville Chronicle, covered at least one of their matches, as the Comets played at Medford Street Gym in Charlestown, Massachusetts with several local players. After a win over Detroit (the Hawks' first loss of the season) on February 3, 1979, the Comets record was reported as 4-0, including two victories over Philadelphia in December. Whether the league's first season (scheduled to run through April 1979) was completed is unknown; most likely, the NTL died quickly and disappeared. ("National Teamball League, Inc." was incorporated by Johnson in August 1978 and dissolved in March 1980.)

In 2020, former USA Team Handball CEO Barry Siff stated that plans were in development to create an American professional team handball league. The new, unnamed league's launch is scheduled for 2023, with 10 teams initially worth three to five million dollars apiece. There are also plans to cooperate with NBA or NHL owners in one-tenant arena situations, and perhaps create multisports clubs like FC Barcelona or Paris Saint-Germain.

See also 
 United States men's national handball team
 United States women's national handball team

References